
Gmina Bolimów is a rural gmina (administrative district) in Skierniewice County, Łódź Voivodeship, in central Poland.

The gmina contains part of the protected area called Bolimów Landscape Park.

Villages
Gmina Bolimów contains the villages and settlements of Bolimów, Bolimowska Wieś, Humin, Humin-Dobra Ziemskie, Jasionna, Joachimów-Mogiły, Józefów, Kęszyce-Wieś, Kolonia Bolimowska-Wieś, Kolonia Wola Szydłowiecka, Kurabka, Łasieczniki, Nowe Kęszyce, Podsokołów, Sierzchów, Sokołów, Wola Szydłowiecka, Wólka Łasiecka, Ziąbki and Ziemiary.

Neighbouring gminas
Gmina Bolimów is bordered by the gminas of Nieborów, Nowa Sucha, Puszcza Mariańska, Skierniewice and Wiskitki.

References
Polish official population figures 2006

Bolimow
Skierniewice County